Are These Our Children? is a 1931 American pre-Code drama film directed by Wesley Ruggles and written by Howard Estabrook. The film stars Eric Linden, Ben Alexander, Beryl Mercer, Mary Kornman, Arline Judge, and Rochelle Hudson. The film was released on November 14, 1931 by RKO Pictures.

Plot
Eddie Brand (Eric Linden) is a high school student in New York City.  After he loses an oratory contest about the U.S. Constitution, he becomes depressed and leaves his girl friend Mary (Rochelle Hudson) to take up with Flo Carnes (Arline Judge) and her hardcore friends, Maybelle (Roberta Gale), Agnes (Mary Kornman), Nick Crosby (Ben Alexander) and Bennie Gray (Bobby Quirk), in spite of his grandmother's warnings.  He and his new crowd of friends get drunk on gin in jazz clubs and dance halls, and start robbing strangers for cash.  Eddie drops out of school and become more and more dependent on liquor.

One night, Eddie, needing a drink, shoots an old family friend, Heinrich "Heinie" Krantz (William Orlamond), who has refused to sell him a bottle of booze.  When Eddie, Nick and Bennie are arrested for the murder, Nick blurts out the truth on the witness stand, and Eddie is given the death penalty, with Nick and Bennie given life sentences.

Cast

Eric Linden as Edward "Eddie" Brand
Ben Alexander as Nicholas "Nick" Crosby
Beryl Mercer as Mrs. Martin, Eddie's Grandma
Mary Kornman as Agnes "Dumbbell"
Arline Judge as Florence "Flo" Carnes
Roberta Gale as Maybelle "Giggles"
Rochelle Hudson as Mary
Billy Butts as Bobby Brand
William Orlamond as Heinrich "Heinie" Krantz
Bobby Quirk as Bennie Gray
Ralf Harolde as Prosecutor
James Wang as Sam Kong
Robert McKenzie as Oscar Cook
Earl Pingree as Charlie
Russell Powell as Sam
Harry Shutan as Defense attorney

References

External links
 
 
 

1931 drama films
1931 films
American black-and-white films
American drama films
Films directed by Wesley Ruggles
RKO Pictures films
Films with screenplays by Howard Estabrook
1930s English-language films
1930s American films